The following is the list of episodes of Crush Gear Turbo, where the airdate shown is the date of the episode aired in Japan for the first time.

Crush Gear Turbo